, is a Japanese racing driver who was the 2005 Super GT champion for the GT300 category. He raced a Toyota MR-S with Tetsuya Yamano to win the 2005 title.

2008 Aston Martin Asia Cup season
On 13–14 December, Kota Sasaki took the 2008 Aston Martin Asia Cup title with a double win in the final rounds held at the Zhuhai International Circuit, China. In taking the AMAC title Sasaki is rewarded with a fully sponsored season in a Vantage N24 in the 2009 FIA GT4 Championship.

References

External links
Aston Martin Asia Cup Driver Profile
Speedsport magazine database

1974 births
Living people
Japanese racing drivers
Formula Nippon drivers
Super GT drivers
Japanese Formula 3 Championship drivers
Asian Le Mans Series drivers

Nürburgring 24 Hours drivers